Maria Theodorakis is an Australian actress who has many credits in television, movies and theatre. She is best known for her roles in the television series CrashBurn and Marshall Law. She has also had guest roles in many television series including Blue Heelers, Stingers, Halifax f.p., State Coroner and Rush.

Theodorakis has also appeared in a number of films including The Castle, The Eye of the Storm and Walking on Water, her role in which won her the 2002 Australian Film Institute Award for Best Actress in a Leading Role.

References

External links

Living people
Australian film actresses
Australian television actresses
Australian people of Greek descent
Best Actress AACTA Award winners
Year of birth missing (living people)